Thomas Newton Allen (born 1839) was a lawyer in Lexington, Kentucky. He moved to Olympia, Washington c1889, where he was a clerk and then a lawyer.  He was friend to the state governor John H. McGraw.  Allen is remembered today for writing a book, Chronicles of Oldfields in 1909, which is found on lists of books for those studying slavery in the United States.

Some of his correspondence is kept at Washington State University, Holland Library, Manuscripts, Archives & Special Collections, Allen, Thomas Newton. Papers, 1889–1893.

Books
 Chronicle of Oldfields, published by The Alice Harriman Company, Seattle, 1909 Online text

References

Other censuses
Thomas Newton Allen and family were found on other censuses than were used for the article. The information is below for those interested:

 1900 US Federal Census, year 1900; location Olympia Ward 5, Thurston, Washington; roll T624_1672; pages 10b and 11a; starting on line 99; enumdist 228.
 1910 US Federal Census, year 1910; location Olympia, Thurston, Washington; roll T623  1752; page 2B; starting on line 81; enumdist 0307; Image 1072; FHL Number 1375685.

Writers from Olympia, Washington
1839 births
Writers from Lexington, Kentucky
Year of death missing
American male writers